Cristopher Daniel Karlsson-Nilstorp  (born 16 February 1984) is a Swedish former professional ice hockey goaltender. He currently serves as the goaltending coach for the Malmö Redhawks.

Playing career 
Undrafted, Nilstorp's youth team was the Malmö Redhawks. After helping Rögle BK gain promotion to the then Swedish Elite League and later capturing a Championship title with Färjestads BK, on 5 June 2012 Nihlstorp signed a one year, two-way contract with the Dallas Stars. In the 2012–13 season, Nilstorp made his NHL debut with the Stars, appearing in 5 games for 1 win.

In his second season within the Stars organization, Nilstorp failed to establish a NHL roster spot. However, he helped lead affiliate,  the Texas Stars of the American Hockey League (AHL), to their first Calder Cup Championship in the 2013–14 season.

Two days after capturing the Calder Cup, Nilstorp opted to return to Sweden in search of a first choice goaltending role on a two-year contract with Växjö Lakers of the SHL on 23 June 2014. Following his two-year stint with Växjö, he returned to the Malmö Redhawks for the 2016–17 season.

On 30 April 2019, Nihlstorp left the Redhawks and the SHL, agreeing to a one-year contract with Austrian club, Graz 99ers of the EBEL.

Awards and honors

References

External links

1984 births
Living people
Dallas Stars players
Färjestad BK players
Graz 99ers players
Malmö Redhawks players
Nybro Vikings players
Sportspeople from Malmö
Rögle BK players
Swedish ice hockey goaltenders
Texas Stars players
Undrafted National Hockey League players
Växjö Lakers players
21st-century Swedish people